Always Pack Your Uniform on Top is a live album by bassist Steve Swallow recorded at Ronnie Scott's Jazz Club in December 1999 and released on the Xtra Watt label in 2000.

Reception

Allmusic awarded the album 3 stars and the review by David R. Adler states: "This is Swallow's third standards-derived quintet album, following in the footsteps of 1994's Real Book and 1996's Deconstructed... Although there's a brand new batch of tunes, Swallow applies the same approach, using familiar progressions as the basis for clever original music". In JazzTimes Bill Bennett wrote: "His gifts as a composer is equally evident in this set... Throughout, the ensemble work is outstanding, with Goodrick and Nussbaum in constant touch". On All About Jazz Glen Astarita noted: "Always Pack Your Uniform On Top is a class act - as the band most assuredly brought down the house at this time-honored jazz venue".

Track listing
All compositions by Steve Swallow.
 "Bend over Backward" - 11:29
 "Dog With a Bone" - 6:12
 "Misery Loves Company" - 7:48
 "Reinventing the Wheel" - 7:48
 "Feet First" - 7:26
 "La Nostalgie de la Boue" - 6:49

Personnel
Steve Swallow - bass guitar
Barry Ries - trumpet
Chris Potter - tenor saxophone
Mick Goodrick - guitar
Adam Nussbaum - drums

References

Steve Swallow live albums
2000 live albums